The 2011 Copa Libertadores de Fútbol Femenino was the third edition of the Copa Libertadores de Fútbol Femenino, CONMEBOL's premier annual international women's football club tournament. It was again held in Brazil from 13 to 27 November 2011.  Santos were the defending champions.

The competition was won by the local team São José for the first time. Two time champion Santos finished in third place. Caracas' Ysaura Viso won the top-scorer award having scored nine goals in her team's five matches.

Changes from 2010
The tournament was expanded from 10 to 12 teams. This allows for Santos to enter and be able to defend the trophy. As well as a local team from the host city.

Format
The twelve teams are divided in three groups of four. The teams then play each other once. After that the group winners and the best runner-up qualify for the semi-finals. Those as well as the final are single-legged, i.e. no home and away matches.

Qualified teams
There have been talks to expand the competition to 12 teams, give one spot to title holders Santos and one spot to the Japanese 2011 L. League champion. Ultimately it was decided to give the twelfth spot to a local team of the host city.

Each team was allowed to nominate 20 players for the tournament.

First stage
The group winner and the best runners-up advanced to the semifinals. The draw and fixtures were announced on 1 November 2011.

Tie-breaker in case of equal points is:
 Goal difference
 Goals scored
 Match between tied teams
If still tied the organisers may decide how to proceed. In case two team are tied after having played each other the last matchday, the tie is decided by a penalty shootout.

Group A

Group B

Group C

Ranking of second place-finishers
In the ranking of group runners-ups all matches do count towards the ranking. Caracas finished as best runners-up and advanced to the semi-finals.

Final stages
Santos meets São José in the semi-finals. That is contrary to the initial regulations, as only on 14 November 2011, during the tournament, it was decided that if two teams from the same country make the semi-finals they would be paired in the semi-final so there would be no national final.

Semifinals

Third-place match

Final

References

External links
Official website
Team squads
Tournament on soccerway.com

2011
2011 in women's association football
2011 in South American football
Lib
International club association football competitions hosted by Brazil
International women's association football competitions hosted by Brazil